Chinchilla–Wondai Road is a continuous  road route in the Western Downs and South Burnett regions of Queensland, Australia. Part of the route is signed as State Route 82. It is a state-controlled part regional and part district road (number 426).

Route Description
It runs generally north-east through Chinchilla, following Colamba Street and Park Street until it becomes Chinchilla–Wondai Road.

Here the country is more thickly timbered, with the principal land use being stock raising on native vegetation.

Road condition
The road is fully sealed.

State Route 82
It is not necessarily the best or the shortest or the quickest route between the two terminii. It was proclaimed as a State Route because, at the time, it was the most convenient route for many users. It is also an example of why motorists in unfamiliar territory should follow a designated route rather than rely on a vehicle navigation system, which may direct them onto less suitable alternative roads.

The route follows Chinchilla–Wondai Road west from Tingoora to Durong, where it turns south to Jinghi. In Jandowae the road name changes to Dalby–Jandowae Road, which continues to the Warrego Highway in the west of Dalby. From there it follows the Warrego Highway to the south-east until it reaches Dalby–Cecil Plains Road, where it continues south.

Note that many navigation systems will suggest a turn to the west in Cecil Plains, leading to Millmerran–Cecil Plains Road. This road continues south to Inglewood, where it meets the Cunningham Highway at a T-junction.

History

In 1848, before Queensland became a separate State, the Chinchilla pastoral run was recorded in the New South Wales Lands Office. In 1878, when the Western railway line was being extended from Dalby, a construction camp was established at Charleys Creek. This soon became the town of Chinchilla, with a post office opening in 1878, the railway station in 1880, and a school in 1883. In the early 1900s the development of small farms was actively encouraged. 

The next three localities on the road to the east from Chinchilla were first settled as pastoral runs. Canaga pastoral run was taken up in the early 1850s, and in 1853 was transferred to members of the Bell family, the owners of Jimbour Station. Jinghi Jinghi pastoral run, which existed in 1849, is believed to have been part of Jimbour. The Darr pastoral run was established in the early 1850s.

From its inception in 1842, Jimbour grew to be a massive collection of pastoral runs through purchase of nearby leases. In 1877,  of land was resumed to establish smaller farms. The location of these is unknown, but some may have been along the road from Chinchilla to Durong. Farms and villages were eventually established along the road, with Canaga opening a school in 1911, Jinghi in 1915 and Darr Creek in 1922. Durong also opened its first school in 1923.

Wondai was first settled in the 1850s, with closer settlement in the early 1900s. The first school opened in 1905. Tingoora was established in 1900 and the railway arrived in 1904, the year in which farm allotments were advertised for sale nearby. Little is known of the early history of the localities between Durong and Tingoora, except that Cushnie opened its first school in 1906.

Early roads to the east of Chinchilla were cut to enable access to the pastoral runs. With the advent of small farms and villages came a need for better roads. There was never any plan for a rail link between Chinchilla and Wondai, so road building and improvement became a necessity.

Major intersections
All distances are from Google Maps.

See also

 List of road routes in Queensland
 List of numbered roads in Queensland

Notes

References

Roads in Queensland